Alexander Smith (born 11 May 1947) is a former professional footballer, who played for Ossett Albion, Bradford City, Huddersfield Town, Southend United, Colchester United and Halifax Town.

References
 

1947 births
Living people
English footballers
People from Thornhill, West Yorkshire
Association football defenders
English Football League players
Bradford City A.F.C. players
Huddersfield Town A.F.C. players
Southend United F.C. players
Colchester United F.C. players
Halifax Town A.F.C. players